Revda is an urban locality (an urban-type settlement) in Lovozersky District of Murmansk Oblast, Russia, located  southeast of Murmansk.  Population: 

It was founded in 1950 as a loparite ore mining and processing settlement.

To the north of Revda, one of the Russian Alpha transmitters is located.

In 2009, Barents Observer reported that Revda was likely to be closed down and its inhabitants relocated, due to the collapse of the mining industry.

External links
Unofficial website of Revda

References

Urban-type settlements in Murmansk Oblast
Monotowns in Russia